The following is a list of FM and AM radio stations in Pekanbaru, Indonesia which can be sorted by their frequencies, names, legal entities, slogans and programming formats.

References 

Pekanbaru
Pekanbaru